The Manenguba shrew ('Crocidura manengubae'') is a species of mammal in the family Soricidae. It is endemic to Cameroon.  Its natural habitat is subtropical or tropical moist montane forests.

Sources

Crocidura
Mammals of Cameroon
Endemic fauna of Cameroon
Mammals described in 1982
Taxonomy articles created by Polbot